Rodden is a village and former municipality in the district Saalekreis, Saxony-Anhalt, Germany.

Rodden may also refer to:
 Rodden, Illinois, an unincorporated township in the United States
 Rodden, Somerset, a village in England
 Beth Rodden (born 1980), American rock climber
 Bradley Rodden (born 1989), New Zealand cricketer
 Eddie Rodden (1901-1986), Canadian professional ice hockey player 
 Lois Rodden (1928-2003), Canadian astrologer
 Keith Rodden (born 1981), American stock car racing crew chief
 Mike Rodden (1891-1978), Canadian sports journalist

See also
 Roden (disambiguation)
 Roddon, a dried raised bed of a watercourse such as a river or tidal creek